Thelma is a female given name. It was popularized by Victorian writer Marie Corelli who gave the name to the title character of her 1887 novel Thelma. It may be related to a Greek word meaning "will, volition" see thelema). Note that although consonant with another female given name, Selma, the two are not synonymous.

People with the name
 Thelma Akana Harrison (1905–1972), American politician
 Thelma Aoyama (born 1987), Japanese pop singer
 Thelma Barlow (born 1929), English actress
 Thelma Carpenter (1922–1997), American jazz singer and actress
 Thelma Cazalet-Keir (1899–1989), British politician
 Thelma Drake (born 1949), American politician
 Thelma Eisen (1922–2014), American baseball player
 Thelma Fardin (born 1992), Argentine actress
 Thelma Forbes (1910–2012), Canadian politician
 Thelma Furness, Viscountess Furness (1904–1970), mistress of King Edward VIII
 Thelma Harper (politician) (1940–2021), Tennessee politician
 Thelma Hill (1906–1938), American silent screen actress
 Thelma Holt (born 1932), stage actress and producer
 Telma Hopkins (born 1948), American singer and actress
 Thelma Hopkins (athlete) (born 1936), British athlete
 Thelma Houston (born 1946), American singer
 Thelma Leeds (1910–2006), American actress
 Thelma Coyne Long (1918–2015), Australian tennis player
 Thelma Nava (1932–2019), Mexican poet, magazine co-founder, publisher, journalist
 Thelma "Pat" Nixon (1912–1993), former First Lady of the United States
 Thelma Parr (1906–2000), American actress
 Thelma Pressman (1921–2010), American microwave cooking consultant and cookbook author
 Thelma Rodgers, Antarctic scientist from New Zealand
 Thelma Ritter (1902–1969), American actress
 Thelma Schoonmaker (born 1940), American film editor
 Thelma Terry (1901–1966), American bandleader
 Thelma Thall (born 1924), American two-time world table tennis champion
 Thelma Todd (1906–1935), American actress and businesswoman
 Thelma Toole (1901–1984), mother of American author John Kennedy Toole
 Thelma Votipka (1906–1972), American opera singer
 Thelma Wood (1901–1970), American artist and lover of Djuana Barnes

Fictional characters
 Thelma Bates, from the TV series Hex
 Thelma Evans, in the sitcom Good Times 
 Thelma Harper, from The Carol Burnett Show and Mama's Family
 Thelma Lou, on The Andy Griffith Show
 Thelma Griffin, from Family Guy
 Thelma Dickinson from the 1991 film Thelma and Louise
 Thelma, protagonist of the eponymous 2017 film Thelma
 T.H.E.L.M.A. an android from the Nickelodeon sci-fi series, Space Cases
 Thelma, a character referred to as "New Thelma" in the Junie B. Jones book series

References

English feminine given names